Behind the Headlines is a 1956 British crime film directed by Charles Saunders and starring Paul Carpenter, Adrienne Corri, Hazel Court and Alfie Bass. The plot revolves around a male and female journalist joining forces to hunt down a murderer.

It was made at Southall Studios. The film was based on the novel Behind the Headlines by Robert Chapman.

Plot
American Paul Banner used to be a reporter working in London. Recently leaving his paper, he has gone freelance, so that he can focus more on chasing down facts and selling his stories once he gets them. He has no regrets in leaving his job as there will be no more deadlines or misguided editors to divert his attention. He starts up a news service, Banners News Agency, whose motto is "ferret out the facts and sell them to the highest bidder."

When showgirl Nina Duke is murdered, the press are all harrying the police for statements and facts but Banner hangs back and does a little work of his own to uncover the story. Nina, it transpires, was previously in jail for blackmail, so it is possible that this was why she was killed. Banner initially falls for the affections of rival reporter Pam Barnes, but his true affections lie with his secretary, Maxine.

A race to find the killer has Banner trying to get the story that the police cannot.

Cast

 Paul Carpenter as Paul Banner 
 Adrienne Corri as Pam Barnes 
 Hazel Court as Maxine 
 Alfie Bass as Sammy 
 Ewen Solon as Superintendent Faro 
 Trevor Reid as Bunting 
 Melissa Stribling as Mary Carrick 
 Olive Gregg as Mrs. Bunting 
 Harry Fowler as Alfie 
 Magda Miller as Nina Duke 
 Arthur Rigby as Hollings 
 Leonard Williams as Jock Macrae 
 Gaylord Cavallaro as Jeff Holly 
 Tom Gill as Creloch 
 Colin Rix as Bernard 
 Anita Wuest as Model 
 Sandra Colville as Waitress 
 Marian Collins as Nurse 
 Constance Wake as Receptionist

Production
Director Charles Saunders made One Jump Ahead (1955), which had many similarities to Behind the Headlines. The story of a news reporter investigating a murder, was again played by Paul Carpenter from a story by Robert Chapman. Saunders specialised in the B movie at the Kenilworth Films Production house which turned out 11 mainly crime thrillers between 1948 and 1956.

Critical reception
In its review of Behind the Headlines, TV Guide concluded, "Weak script and stiff direction offer little suspense in this routine yarn";<ref>"Overview: 'Behind The Headlines'." TV Guide, 2016. Retrieved: @4 August 2016.</ref> whereas the Radio Times wrote, "... this is elevated above the morass of British crime B-movies by a sure sense of newsroom atmosphere that owes more to Hollywood than Pinewood... there's a convincing seediness about the backstage milieu thanks to Geoffrey Faithfull's unfussy photography. It may lack suspense and newsman Paul Carpenter is short on charisma, but there's admirable support from the likes of Adrienne Corri, Hazel Court and Alfie Bass."

References
Notes

Bibliography

 Chibnall, Steve and Brian McFarlane. The British 'B' Film. London: Palgrave MacMillan, 2009. .
 Goble, Alan. The Complete Index to Literary Sources in Film''. London: Walter de Gruyter, 1999. .

External links
 

1956 films
1956 crime films
British crime films
Films directed by Charles Saunders
Films based on British novels
Films set in London
Films about journalists
Films shot at Southall Studios
Films about murder
1950s English-language films
1950s British films
British black-and-white films